Amenia is a genus of flies belonging to the family Calliphoridae.

Larvae 

Studies suggest that all species of Amenia are macrolarviparous, giving birth to well developed and large larvae.

Distribution 
The species of the genus Amenia are found in Australia.

Species 
Source:

Amenia albosquamata 
Amenia chrysame 
Amenia crinita 
Amenia imperialis 
Amenia leonina 
Amenia longicornis 
Amenia sexpunctata

References

Calliphoridae